Wing Commander James Flint,  (24 May 1913 – 16 December 2013) was a British businessman and decorated Royal Air Force officer. During active service in World War II, he gained the unique distinction of receiving two gallantry awards for separate actions during the same operation.

Early life
Flint was born on 24 May 1913 in Nottingham, England. He was one of four children of William and Edith Flint. He was educated at Trent Bridge Central School. He left school at 14 and began work. However, the company soon went bust and he was offered a job by the company that undertook the liquidation. He then trained as an accountant with the firm, R. A. Page.

Military service
In August 1938, he joined the Royal Air Force Volunteer Reserve and was accepted for pilot training. When World War II broke out in September 1939, he was called up for full-time service and continued his pilot training at RAF Tollerton and RAF Brize Norton. In January 1941, he completed pilot training and received his wings. He was posted to No. 49 Squadron RAF, based at RAF Scampton, as a sergeant pilot in February 1941. His first mission was not as a pilot but as a navigator. He had volunteered to fill in for the original navigator who had fallen ill. As a pilot, he flew missions that were attacks against targets in Nazi Germany.

Flint was awarded the George Medal (GM) and the Distinguished Flying Medal (DFM) for actions that occurred on the same flight in an Handley Page Hampden, on the night of 5/6 July 1941. He was awarded an immediate DFM for his 'cool courage and determination to strike at the enemy' during the flight. On 7 November 1941, he was awarded the George Medal.

Flint's tour ended in September 1941 and he was rested from flight operations serving on the ground as an airfield controller. He was a flight sergeant when he was offered a commission for the second time. Having accepted, he was commissioned on 1 May 1942 into the General Duties branch of the Royal Air Force Volunteer Reserve as a pilot officer (emergency). He spent the next two years at a bomber training unit as an instructor. He was promoted to flying officer (war substantive) on 1 November 1942. He was promoted flight lieutenant on 12 November 1942. In 1944, he converted to the Lancaster Bomber and was posted to No. 50 Squadron RAF as commanding officer. His squadron flew as air support during the Normandy Landings of June 1944. He was promoted to squadron leader (war substantive) on 11 June 1945. He commanded No. 50 Squadron RAF until the end of the war, having undertaken 20 sorties with them.

On 23 March 1945, he was awarded the Distinguished Flying Cross (DFC). Flint was demobbed in 1945. On 24 May 1958, he was allowed to retain the rank of wing commander.

Later life
After being demobilised in 1945, Flint took up employment with a sports outfitters and suppliers, Redmayne and Todd. He then became a representative and director of a hairdressing equipment company, which he worked for until his retirement in 1978.

Flint died on 16 December 2013, aged 100.

References

1913 births
2013 deaths
English accountants
Royal Air Force wing commanders
Recipients of the Distinguished Flying Cross (United Kingdom)
Recipients of the George Medal
Recipients of the Distinguished Flying Medal
Royal Air Force Volunteer Reserve personnel of World War II
English centenarians
Men centenarians
Royal Air Force pilots of World War II
20th-century English businesspeople
Military personnel from Nottingham